IRISS can refer to:

 Iriss, a Scottish charitable company
 IRIS², an EU satellite constellation project
 for the Iriss space mission, see Andreas Mogensen